Consequences is an old parlour game in a similar vein to the Surrealist game exquisite corpse and Mad Libs.

Each player is given a sheet of paper, and all are told to write down a word or phrase to fit a description ("an animal"), optionally with some extra words to make the story. Each player then folds the paper over to hide the most recent line, and hands it to the next person. At the end of the game, the stories are read out.

Example game
The exact sequence varies, but an example sequence given in Everyman's Word Games is:
 An adjective
 A man's name
 The word met followed by an adjective
 A woman's name
 The word at followed by where they met
 The word to followed by what they went there for
 The words he wore followed by what he wore
 The words she wore followed by what she wore
 What he did
 What she did
 The words and the consequence was followed by details of what happened as a result
 The words and the world said followed by what it said

The same reference book gives the following example of a completed story:

Variations
Consequences can also be played in a drawing version, sometimes known as picture consequences, where the first player draws the head, passes it unseen (by means of folding) to the second player who draws the body, then on to the third player who draws the legs. The composite person or creature is then revealed to all by unfolding the paper.

Although Consequences originally is an analogue game there are digital versions available, some of which are slightly modified and adjusted to a digital roam. Examples: FoldingStory™, Unfolding Stories, etc. The game has also been seen as a precursor to computer-generated literature such as Christopher Strachey's Love letter generator M.U.C.

References

Comedy games
Paper-and-pencil games
Party games
Random text generation